Tinea chlorospora is a moth of the family Tineidae. It was described by Edward Meyrick in 1924. It is found on Fiji.

References

Moths described in 1924
Tineinae